The Callan Augustinian Friary is an Augustinian friary situated in Callan, Co Kilkenny, Ireland. It is known locally as the "Abbey Meadow" and is located to the north-east of the town, on the banks of the Kings River. The new Augustinian Friary located in the town via the river is connected to the Abbey.

History
In 1461, Edmund MacRichard Butler successfully petitioned Pope Pius II for the foundation of the friary. After Edmund died in 1462, the buildings were erected by his son, James Butler who is regarded as the founder of the monastery. The foundation date of the friary is typically given as 1471, is likely to have actually been two or three years earlier, in 1468 or 1469.

In 1472 the friary became observant—its community adopted the fashion then spreading across Europe for the strictest observance of the monastic rules — and in 1479 it became the centre of the Irish Observant Congregation.

The friary was dissolved and its lands confiscated by the order of Henry VIII in 1540. It passed into the hands of the Earls of Ormond. 

The history of the Augustinians in Callan from 1540 - 1766 is now lost, but it is known that members of the order returned to the monastery, and there is a wealth of documentary evidence indicating that Augustinian friars were resident in Callan from the mid 17th century.

A new monastery for the Augustinian friars was founded in the town of Callan in 1766 and was closed by the order in Easter 2001.

Architecture 
The friary church is a long, rectangular building with a central bell-tower. The east end or choir, is lit by an east window and in its south wall is one of the finest sedilia (a seat for officiating priests) in Ireland.

The domestic buildings and the cloister court no longer survive. However, a freshwater well still remains on the grounds of the abbey.

See also
 List of National Monuments in County Kilkenny
 List of abbeys and priories in Ireland (County Kilkenny)

References

Notes

Sources 

Religious buildings and structures completed in 1467
Augustinian monasteries in the Republic of Ireland
Buildings and structures in County Kilkenny
Religion in County Kilkenny
Ruins in the Republic of Ireland
1470s establishments in Ireland
Christian monasteries established in the 15th century
National Monuments in County Kilkenny
Callan, County Kilkenny